The 2015 AFC Futsal Club Championship was the 6th edition of the AFC Futsal Club Championship, the annual Asian futsal club championship organized by the Asian Football Confederation (AFC). The tournament was held in Isfahan, Iran between July 31 and August 7, 2015.

Qualified teams

A total of 12 teams from 12 AFC member associations participated in the tournament. Tasisat Daryaei of Iran, as the representatives of the host association, and Nagoya Oceans of Japan, as the defending champions, automatically qualified for the finals. The other teams are from Thailand, China, Uzbekistan, Kuwait, Kyrgyzstan, Qatar, Vietnam, United Arab Emirates, Iraq, and Lebanon.

Venue

Draw
The draw was held on 10 June 2015 in Isfahan. The 12 teams were drawn into four groups of three teams (one seeded team and two unseeded teams). Besides the team from the host association Iran, the teams from Japan, Thailand, and China were also seeded as per the final ranking of the 2014 AFC Futsal Club Championship.

Group stage
The top two teams of each group advanced to the quarter-finals.

Tiebreakers
The teams were ranked according to points (3 points for a win, 1 point for a draw, 0 points for a loss). If tied on points, tiebreakers would be applied in the following order:
Greater number of points obtained in the group matches between the teams concerned;
Goal difference resulting from the group matches between the teams concerned;
Greater number of goals scored in the group matches between the teams concerned;
If, after applying criteria 1 to 3, teams still have an equal ranking, criteria 1 to 3 is reapplied exclusively to the matches between the teams in question to determine their final rankings. If this procedure does not lead to a decision, criteria 5 to 9 apply;
Goal difference in all the group matches;
Greater number of goals scored in all the group matches;
Penalty shoot-out if only two teams are involved and they are both on the field of play;
Fewer score calculated according to the number of yellow and red cards received in the group matches (1 point for a single yellow card, 3 points for a red card as a consequence of two yellow cards, 3 points for a direct red card, 4 points for a yellow card followed by a direct red card);
Drawing of lots.

All times are local, IRDT (UTC+3:30).

Group A

Group B

Group C

Group D

Knockout stage
In the knockout stage, the extra time and penalty shoot-out were used to decide the winner if necessary (no extra time would be used in the third-place match).

Bracket

Quarter-finals

Semi-finals

Third place play-off

Final

Awards

 Most Valuable Player
  Vahid Shamsaei
 Top Scorer
  Vahid Shamsaei (10 goals)
 Fair-Play Award
  Thái Sơn Nam
 All-Star Team
  Mostafa Nazari (Tasisat Daryaei) (GK)
  Vahid Shamsaei (Tasisat Daryaei)
  Ali Asghar Hassanzadeh (Tasisat Daryaei)
  Abdulrahman Al Wadi (Al-Qadsia)
  Mohammad Taheri (Al-Qadsia)
 Reserve All-Star Team
  Kirill Ermolov (MFC Emgek) (GK)
  Saul Olmo Campana (Thái Sơn Nam)
  Abdulrahman Altawail (Al-Qadsia)
  Trần Long Vũ (Thái Sơn Nam)
  Mohammad Nasser Safari (Naft Al-Wasat)
 Coach:  Amir Shamsaei (Tasisat Daryaei)

Top goalscorers

Final standing

References

External links
AFC Futsal Club Championship, the-AFC.com

2015
Club
2015
2015–16 in Iranian futsal